Antigua and Barbuda competed at the 2022 World Aquatics Championships in Budapest, Hungary from 18 June to 3 July.

Swimming

Swimmers from Antigua and Barbuda have achieved qualifying standards in the following events.

References

Nations at the 2022 World Aquatics Championships
Antigua and Barbuda at the World Aquatics Championships
World Aquatics Championships